is a women's football club playing in Japan's football league, Hokushinetsu League. Its hometown is the city of Niigata.

Squad

Current squad 
As of 14 July 2020.

Results

References

External links
 official site
 Japanese Club Teams

Women's football clubs in Japan
Association football clubs established in 1991
1991 establishments in Japan
Sports teams in Niigata Prefecture